Service Employees International Union, Local 32BJ (often shortened to SEIU 32BJ, 32BJ SEIU or just 32BJ), is a branch of Service Employees International Union headquartered in New York City which mainly represents building workers (maintenance, custodial, janitorial, window cleaners) and has about 150,000 members in ten northeastern states, Washington, D.C., Florida and other parts of the United States

Composition

According to SEIU 32BJ's Department of Labor records since 2005, when membership classifications were first reported, around a quarter of the union's membership are considered part time.

History
In 1941, James Bambrick, 32B president since its founding, was forced to resign his union post and later served a sentence for embezzlement. Secretary-Treasurer David Sullivan, who had battled for financial integrity and safeguards, was elected to replace Bambrick.

In 1991, members of 32BJ went on a labor strike, and nearly came to strike in 2006 and 2010.

In the 21st century, locals that merged into 32BJ include: Local 615 (previously known as Local 254) (Massachusetts, Rhode Island and New Hampshire, merged 2013)

Past Presidents
 David Sullivan (1941–1960)
 John J. Sweeney (1976–1981), oversaw merger of Local 32J
 Gus Bevona (1981–1999)
 Héctor Figueroa (2012–2019; his death)

See also
 International Brotherhood of Stationary Firemen and Oilers

Footnotes

External links

32BJ Funds
SEIU Local 32B-32J Records at the Walter P. Reuther Library at Wayne State University

Organizations based in New York City
Trade unions established in 1934
Service Employees International Union
Trade unions in New York (state)
1934 establishments in New York (state)